Bala Bolgur (also Romanized as Bālā Bolgūr; also known as Bālā Bowlgūr, Bolgūr, and Salgūr) is a village in Markiyeh Rural District, Mirza Kuchek Janghli District, Sowme'eh Sara County, Gilan Province, Iran. At the 2006 census, its population was 562, in 162 families.

References 

Populated places in Sowme'eh Sara County